This article contains information about the literary events and publications of 1755.

—Self-deprecating definition by Samuel Johnson from A Dictionary of the English Language

Events
April 15 – Samuel Johnson's A Dictionary of the English Language is published by the group of London booksellers who commissioned it in June 1746.
unknown dates
Milton's Paradise Lost is translated into French prose by Louis Racine.
The first New Testament in the Ume Sami language is published.

New Books

Fiction
Charlotte Charke – The History of Mr. Henry Dumont and Miss Charlotte Evelyn
Eliza Haywood as "Exploralibus" – The Invisible Spy
Samuel Richardson – A Collection of ... Sentiments
John Shebbeare – Letters on the English Nation
Tobias Smollett – The History and Adventures of the Renowned Don Quixote

Poetry

John Byrom – Epistle in Defence of Rhyme
George Colman, the Elder and Bonnell Thornton (ed.) – Poems by Eminent Ladies
John Gilbert Cooper – The Tomb of Shakespear
David Dalrymple (editor) – Edom of Gordon: an ancient Scottish poem
Stephen Duck – Caesar's Camp

Non-fiction
Thomas Amory – Memoirs of Several Ladies of Great Britain
Theophilus Cibber – An Epistle to David Garrick
Madame de Maintenon – Mémoires
Philip Doddridge – Hymns Founded on Various Texts
Henry Fielding – The Journal of a Voyage to Lisbon
Aryeh Leib ben Asher Gunzberg – Shaagas Aryeh (Hebrew: שאגת אריה, "Roar of the Lion")
James Hervey – Theron and Aspasio; or a series of letters upon the most important and interesting subjects
Benjamin Hoadly – Twenty Sermons
Francis Hutcheson – A System of Moral Philosophy
Samuel Johnson – A Dictionary of the English Language
Étienne-Gabriel Morelly – Code de la nature, ou de véritable esprit de ses lois
Frederic Louis Norden – Voyage d'Egypte et de Nubie
Jean-Jacques Rousseau – Discourse on the Origin and Basis of Inequality Among Men
Charles Wesley – An Epistle to John Wesley
Edward Young – The Centaur not Fabulous; in five letters to a friend

Drama
John Brown – Barbarosa
John Cleland – Titus Vespasian
Thomas Francklin – The Orphan of China
David Garrick – The Fairies (opera)
Gotthold Ephraim Lessing – Miss Sara Sampson
David Mallet – Britannia
Vicente Garcia de la Huerta – Endimión

Births
February 17 – Dorothy Kilner, English children's writer (died 1836)
February 21 – Anne Grant, Scottish poet (died 1838)
March 5 – Jozef Ignác Bajza, pioneer Slovak novelist, satirist and priest (died 1836)
March 15 – George Dyer, English poet and classicist (died 1841)
December 31 – Thomas Grenville, English politician and book collector (died 1846)
Unknown date – Maria Elizabetha Jacson, English writer on botany and gardening (died 1829)
1755/6 – Eliza Fay, English letter-writer and traveler (died 1816)

Deaths
February 10 – Charles de Secondat, Baron de Montesquieu, French satirist (born 1689)
March – Jane Collier, English novelist (born 1715)
April 6 – Richard Rawlinson, English antiquary and cleric (born 1690)
September 9 – Johann Lorenz von Mosheim, German Lutheran church historian (born 1693)
December 29 – Gabrielle-Suzanne Barbot de Villeneuve, French children's writer (born c. 1695)
Unknown date – Antoni Serra Serra, Spanish religious writer (born 1708)

References

 
Years of the 18th century in literature